Lubnica may refer to the following places:

North Macedonia
Lubnica, Konče

Poland
Lubnica, Lubusz Voivodeship (west Poland)
Lubnica, Greater Poland Voivodeship (west-central Poland)
Łubnica, Greater Poland Voivodeship (west-central Poland)
Łubnica, Łódź Voivodeship (central Poland)
Łubnica, West Pomeranian Voivodeship (north-west Poland)

Serbia
Lubnica, Zaječar, a village